Shohola Glen Hotel, also known as Rohman's Inn and Shola House, is a historic hotel located at Shohola Township, Pike County, Pennsylvania.  It was built in 1875, and is a -story, "L"-shaped, wood frame, banked building.  It is seven bays wide, cross-gabled roof, and a full-width front porch.  The building was updated in the 1940s, after a fire, at which time a bowling alley was added.

It was added to the National Register of Historic Places in 1997.

References

Hotel buildings on the National Register of Historic Places in Pennsylvania
Hotel buildings completed in 1875
Buildings and structures in Pike County, Pennsylvania
National Register of Historic Places in Pike County, Pennsylvania